Prostanozol, also known as demethylstanozolol tetrahydropyran ether, is an androgen/anabolic steroid (AAS) and designer steroid which acts as a prodrug of the 17α-demethylated analogue of stanozolol (Winstrol). It was found in 2005 as an ingredient of products sold as "dietary supplements" for bodybuilding.

It is one of hundreds of drugs banned from the Olympics by the IOC. Russian marathon runner Lyubov Denisova was banned for two years from competition after testing positive for prostanozol and testosterone in 2007.

References

Abandoned drugs
Androgen ethers
Androgens and anabolic steroids
Androstanes
Designer drugs
Tetrahydropyrans
World Anti-Doping Agency prohibited substances